Going Equipped is an animated short film created by Aardman Animations. It was directed by Peter Lord.

Production
The short was commissioned by Channel 4 as part of a five-part series of Aardman animations called "Lip Synch". The five films in the series were Creature Comforts (1989), Going Equipped (1990), Ident (1990), Next (1989) and War Story (1989).

Plot
Imdb explains: "A young man in prison is interviewed and talks about his life, how he got into prison, and what it's like doing time."

Cast
 Derek Robinson - Himself / interviewer

Critical reception
Going Equipped received a rating of 6.3/10 from 69 users. The One-Line Review "Highly Recommended" the short, and said it "proves to be a melancholy minor-masterpiece and one of Aardman Animations best works."  Animator Mag said "Peter [Lord]’s contribution was a view of life in and out of prison seen through the eyes of a young offender. It is based on a real-life taped interview. The animation is smooth and realistic although watching a plasticine figure acting in a realistic way makes the words even more poignant than if the actual person had been filmed."

References

1990 films
1990 animated films
1990s animated short films
British animated short films
Films directed by Peter Lord
Aardman Animations short films
1990s English-language films
1990s British films